This is a list of bivalves of Hawaii. 139 species of bivalves are found in Hawaiian waters, of which 66 are endemic.

References

External links 

 Burch, T.A. 1987. Beyond the reef: Lyonsiella formosa (Jeffreys, 1881). Hawaii. Shell News 1987(4): 4.
 Burch, T. A. 1995. Corbicula fluminea Müller (Mollusca: Bivalvia) established on Oahu. Bishop Mus. Occas. Pap. 42: 58. 
 Burch, B.L. & T.A. Burch. 1995. New records of deep-water bivalves from the Hawaiian Islands (Mollusca: Bivalvia). Bishop Mus. Occas. Pap. 42: 58–59.

 Dijkstra, H. H. 1987a. Chlamys russata rediscovered. Hawaii. Shell News 1987(4): 3.
 Dijkstra, H. H. 1987b. Cryptopecten alli. Hawaii. Shell News 1987(6): 8.

 Lamy, E. 1937. Révision des Mytilidae vivants du Muséum National d’Histoire Naturelle de Paris. J. Conchyliol. 81: 5– 71, 99–132, 169–97.
 Lamy, E. 1938. Révision des Spondylus vivants du Muséum National d’Histoire Naturelle de Paris. J. Conchyliol. 82: 177– 214, 265–306 + iv. 
  Distributed at 1995 Amer. Malacol. Union Meetings, Hilo, Hawai’i. Univ. Hawai’i, Honolulu. 

  28 Bishop Museum Occasional Papers: No. 45, 1996 
 
  
 
  Ph.D. Dissertation, University of Washington, Seattle. 

  

  
 Reeve, L.A. 1857–1858. Monograph of the genus Mytilus. Conchologia Iconica 10: pls. 1–11. 
 Roch, F. 1976. Die terediniden polynesiens. Boll. Mus. Civ. Stor. Nat. Venezia 28: 33–55. 
  
 
 
  
 
  
 

Bivalves
Bivalves